André de Korver (20 June 1915 – 25 February 1990) was a Dutch racing cyclist. He rode in the 1947 and 1949 Tour de France.

References

External links
 

1915 births
1990 deaths
Dutch male cyclists
Sportspeople from Dordrecht
Cyclists from South Holland
20th-century Dutch people